William 'Bice' Cleary (20 February 1868 – 27 January 1942) was an Australian rules footballer who played for the Fitzroy Football Club in the Victorian Football League (VFL).

Cleary came from South Ballarat, and after two seasons crossed to Fitzroy. He was vice captain in 1894–1896, and after Tom Banks retired, was 28 when he captained Fitzroy in the inaugural VFL season. He resigned the captaincy, which went to Alec Sloan the following season. 

His final game was as a forward pocket in Fitzroy's 1899 Grand Final triumph, having come into the side towards the end of the season after not playing for over a year.

References

External links

Holmesby, Russell and Main, Jim (2007). The Encyclopedia of AFL Footballers. 7th ed. Melbourne: Bas Publishing.

1868 births
Australian rules footballers from Ballarat
Fitzroy Football Club (VFA) players
Fitzroy Football Club players
Fitzroy Football Club Premiership players
South Ballarat Football Club players
1942 deaths
One-time VFL/AFL Premiership players